David Hampton (born 16 December 1947) is a British speed skater. He competed in four events at the 1972 Winter Olympics.

References

1947 births
Living people
British male speed skaters
Olympic speed skaters of Great Britain
Speed skaters at the 1972 Winter Olympics
Place of birth missing (living people)